Ficara is a surname. Notable people with the surname include:

Giorgio Ficara (born 1952), Italian essayist and literary critic 
Pierpaolo Ficara (born 1992), Italian cyclist